Symphysa discalis is a moth in the family Crambidae. It was described by George Hampson in 1912. It is found in Jamaica.

References

Evergestinae
Moths described in 1912